Frank Isaac Spellman (September 17, 1922 – January 12, 2017) was an American middleweight Olympic champion weightlifter. He won a gold medal at the 1948 Olympics, and a bronze medal and a silver medal at the World Championships in 1946–47. He also won a gold medal at the 1950 Maccabiah Games. 

In the US, Spellman won the 1946 and 1948 Amateur Athletic Union (AAU) National titles. He resumed competing in 1961 and won another AAU title that year.

Early and personal life
Spellman was born in Malvern, Pennsylvania, to Sara, an Austrian immigrant and seamstress, and David, a German immigrant and stone quarry foreman who died at forty-eight years of age, and was Jewish. He had four siblings. 

From the ages of seven to seventeen, he lived in the Downtown Jewish Orphan Home in Philadelphia; he subsequently lived in South Philadelphia.

Drafted in 1942, Spellman served in the United States Army for three years during World War II. In 1944, he fought in the Battle of the Bulge. 

After returning from World War II, he lived in, and was a machinist in, York, Pennsylvania. Employed by York Barbell, he represented the York Barbell team. In 1952, he moved to Santa Monica, California, where he lived for eighteen years before relocating to Florida.

In addition to weightlifting, Spellman was a professional photographer. He later lived in Gulf Breeze, Florida.

Spellman died on January 12, 2017, at the age of ninety-four. He had two brothers, Charlie and Harold, two sisters, Ethyl and Frances, and six children: Danny, Kevin, Katie, Yvonne, Larry, and Steve.

Weightlifting career
In 1942, Spellman won the US middleweight junior title in weightlifting.

Spellman won a bronze medal at the 1946 World Weightlifting Championships. That year he set a new US middleweight record with a press of 257.75 pounds. He also won the US Amateur Athletic Union (AAU) middleweight championship.

He won a silver medal at the 1947 World Weightlifting Championships, and a silver medal at the 1947 US championships

Spellman won a gold medal at the 1948 Olympics in Men's 75 kg Weightlifting when he was twenty-five years old, setting Olympic middleweight (165 pound) records in the clean & jerk (336.25 pounds) and the total lift (859.5 pounds). That year he set a new US middleweight record with a press of two hundred and sixty pounds. He also won the US AAU middleweight championship.

In 1949 Spellman won the North American middleweight title, and finished second in the United States championships.

Spellman competed at the 1950 Maccabiah Games in Israel, and won a gold medal at middleweight. That year, he set a new American middleweight record with a press of 261.75 pounds.

In 1951 he finished third in the US championships. In 1952, he finished second at lightweight in the US championships.

In 1954, he established a new world record during the American squat championships with a squat lift of five hundred and ten pounds; he weighed one hundred and seventy pounds at the time. Spellman finished second in light-heavyweight during the American championships.

Spellman resumed competing in 1971, at the age of forty-nine, and won his third national AAU middleweight title that year.

Halls of Fame
Spellman was elected to the United States Weightlifting Hall of Fame, the Helms Athletic Foundation Hall of Fame, and the Porterville Quarterback Hall of Fame. Spellman was inducted into the International Jewish Sports Hall of Fame in 1983. In 1990, he was inducted into the Southern California Jewish Sports Hall of Fame. He was then inducted into the Philadelphia Jewish Sports Hall of Fame in its class of 2003/2004.  In 2011 he was inducted into the Chester County Sports Hall of Fame.

See also
List of select Jewish weightlifters

References

1922 births
2017 deaths
American people of Austrian-Jewish descent
American people of German-Jewish descent
Sportspeople from Philadelphia
Sportspeople from York, Pennsylvania
Sportspeople from Santa Monica, California
American male weightlifters
Sportspeople from Chester County, Pennsylvania
Weightlifters at the 1948 Summer Olympics
Olympic gold medalists for the United States in weightlifting
Maccabiah Games medalists in weightlifting
Jewish weightlifters
Jewish American sportspeople
Competitors at the 1950 Maccabiah Games
Maccabiah Games gold medalists for the United States
United States Army Air Forces soldiers
United States Army personnel of World War II
Olympic medalists in weightlifting
Medalists at the 1948 Summer Olympics
People associated with physical culture
World Weightlifting Championships medalists
21st-century American Jews